Arthur Bernard "Chip" Bok III (born July 25, 1952) is an American editorial cartoonist for the Akron (Ohio) Beacon Journal and the Tampa Bay Times. He has illustrated some of Dave Barry's books, and was a finalist for the Pulitzer Prize in 1997.

Early life
Born in Dayton, Ohio to University of Dayton team physician and former football player Arthur Bernard Bok, Jr.,  Bok began editorial cartooning in 7th grade math class, where he was influenced by Don Martin's work in Mad magazine. He attended college at his father's alma mater, where he was captain of the hockey team.

Career
Prior to working as an editorial cartoonist, Bok held several other jobs such as substitute teaching, concrete labor, wholesale drug sales, and freelance work. From 1981 to 1982 he was staff editorial cartoonist at the Clearwater Sun in Clearwater, Florida. After his time there he drew a lifestyle cartoon for the Miami Herald, illustrate columns for Dave Barry, and creating computer animations for the Viewtron online service. In 1987, he returned to his home state of Ohio where he became an editorial cartoonist for the Akron Beacon Journal.

In 1997 Bok was a finalist for the Pulitzer Prize.

In addition to several collections of cartoons, Bok has also illustrated a children's book written by Helen Thomas, The Great White House Breakout, which was published in 2008.

Personal life
Bok is married to wife Deb and together they have four adult children. He currently lives in Akron, Ohio.

Bibliography 
 Bok! The 9.11 Crisis In Political Cartoons. (University Of Akron Press, 2002) .
 A Recent History of the United States in Political Cartoons: A Look Bok. (University Of Akron Press, 2005) .
 The Great White House Breakout. (illustrator, written by Helen Thomas) (Penguin Group, 2008)  (children's book)

References

External links
Bok's website

1952 births
Living people
American editorial cartoonists
Artists from Akron, Ohio
Artists from Dayton, Ohio
Tampa Bay Times
Miami Herald people
University of Dayton alumni